Mäetaguse Parish was an Estonian municipality located in Ida-Viru County. It had a population of 1,556 (2005) and an area of 285 km² (110 mi²).

Populated places 

Mäetaguse Parish had a small borough, Mäetaguse, and 20 villages.

Villages
Apandiku, Aruküla, Arvila, Atsalama, Ereda, Jõetaguse, Kalina, Kiikla, Liivakünka, Metsküla, Mäetaguse, Pagari, Rajaküla, Ratva, Tarakuse, Uhe, Võhma, Võide, Võrnu, Väike-Pungerja.

References

External links 
  

Former municipalities of Estonia